Skoganvarre Chapel is a chapel of the Church of Norway in Porsanger Municipality in Troms og Finnmark county, Norway. It is located in the village of Skoganvarre. It is an annex chapel for the Porsanger parish which is part of the Indre Finnmark prosti (deanery) in the Diocese of Nord-Hålogaland. The white, wooden church was built in a long church style in 1963 using plans drawn up by the architect Rolf Harlew Jenssen. The church seats about 90 people. The chapel was consecrated on 7 October 1963.

See also
List of churches in Nord-Hålogaland

References

Porsanger
Churches in Finnmark
Wooden churches in Norway
20th-century Church of Norway church buildings
Churches completed in 1963
1963 establishments in Norway
Long churches in Norway